The Madagascar ericoid thickets is a montane shrubland ecoregion, found at higher altitudes on Madagascar's four major mountains.

Geography

The ecoregion covers the area above 1800 m elevation on (from north to south) Tsaratanana (2,876 m), Marojejy (2,133 m), Ankaratra (2,643 m), and Andringitra Massif (2,658 m). The ericoid thickets are surrounded at lower elevations by the Madagascar subhumid forests ecoregion. On Tsaratanana the thickets are higher up, starting above 2,500m. There are smaller areas of thicket in Anjanaharibe-Sud Special Reserve in the north and Andohahela National Park to the south.

Flora
The main plant community is thickets. The thickets are composed of evergreen woody shrubs and low trees, which form a single, often impenetrable stratum never more than 6 meters tall. The shrubs and trees typically have an ericoid habit, with short, twisted stems and ericoid, cupressoid, or myrtilloid leaves.

Characteristic shrubs of the ericoid thickets are from the plant families Asteraceae (species of Psiadia, Helichrysum, Stoebe, and Stenocline), Ericaceae (species of Erica, Agauria, and Vaccinium), Rhamnaceae (Phylica), and Rubiaceae. Low trees, widely-spaced, rise a little higher than the shrub canopy. Native trees include Agauria salicifolia, Ilex mitis, Neocussonia bojeri, Razafimandimbisonia minor, Dodonaea madagascariensis, Tambourissa gracilis, Podocarpus rostratus, Vitex humbertii, Faurea forficuliflora, Pittosporum sp., and several species of Weinmannia. Other plants include the arborescent monocots Dracaena reflexa and Pandanus alpestris. Lichens, mosses, grasses, sedges, and species of Impatiens inhabit the ground layer. Epiphytic mosses and lichens, along with a few small orchids, grow plentifully on the branches of shrubs and trees.

The thickets are home a large number of endemic plants, many of whose closest relatives live in South Africa and the highlands of East Africa. Andringitra alone is home to 150 vascular endemics, including 25 species of orchid. The palm Dypsis acuminum is endemic to the Manongarivo Massif.

In much of the ecoregion, secondary grassland, established by regular livestock grazing and burning, has almost entirely replaced the original thicket vegetation. The most common grasses on Ankaratra's secondary grasslands are Pentameris natalensis, P. humbertii, Andropogon trichozygus, Anthoxanthum madagascariense, Digitaria ankaratrensis, Agrostis elliotii, Merxmuellera macowanii, Brachypodium perrieri, Poa madecassa, P. ankaratrensis, and Festuca camusiana. Secondary grassland species are also found in mountain bogs.

Fauna

These high points of Madagascar are home to less diverse animal life than on the lower slopes, but with a high proportion of endemics. The area was not thoroughly researched until the 1990s. There are at least ten species of endemic and near-endemic reptiles including the dwarf gecko Lygodactylus arnoulti.

Threats and preservation

The thickets are vulnerable to fire, and many have been converted to cattle pasture. The widespread conversion of thickets to secondary grasslands may be relatively recent. In 1777 Ankaratra was reported covered with forest. Until the end of the 19th century Andringitra's thickets were a refuge from trouble for local people and their flocks. Ankaratra's and Andringitra's thickets were mostly converted to pasture in the 20th century.

Andringitra, Tsaratanana, and Marojejy are all protected areas, and Andringitra's thickets have partially recovered since it was protected.

32.1% of the ecoregion is in protected areas. Protected areas include Marojejy National Park, Tsaratanana Strict Nature Reserve, Andringitra National Park, and Rainforests of the Atsinanana World Heritage Site.

See also
Ecoregions of Madagascar

References

External links

 
Montane grasslands and shrublands
Ecoregions of Madagascar
Diana Region
Sava Region
Itasy Region
Haute Matsiatra